Gwembe is a small town in Southern Province of Zambia with a population of about 2000 people. It is the largest town in Gwembe District which is on Lake Kariba between Siavonga and Sinazongwe Districts. It used to be the district headquarters until it moved to Munyumbwe some 30 km south-east of the town.

One of the main agricultural activities in this district used to be cotton growing which was influenced by the presence of a cotton ginnery plant, which provided a lot of employment to the residents. As of 2017, the local people have focused on growing maize as a source of food and income. Most of the residents are subsistence farmers. 
Gwembe district is divided into three areas, Gwembe township, Munyumbwe and Chipepo. There are two chiefs, Munyumbwe in charge of Gwembe and Munyumbwe and Chipepo, in charge of Chipepo.
Politically, it is a district as well as a constituency, thus all three parts are represented by only one member of Parliament and several councilors. Despite having major basic needs (clean water, health services and schools), Gwembe is still underdeveloped. There are no proper roads, no banks, and no refueling stations. 

Populated places in Southern Province, Zambia